Kadyrbek Telmanovich Sarbayev is a Kyrgyz diplomat who is a former Minister of Foreign Affairs of Kyrgyzstan serving in the position from January 25 2009, 2 April 15, 2010. Has the diplomatic rank of Extraordinary and Plenipotentiary.

Biography
Born on December 9, 1966 in the city of Frunze, in the capital of the Kyrgyz SSR. 
Graduated from the Far Eastern State University, Vladivostok (1992). He speaks Kyrgyz, Russian, Chinese and English. 
He began his career in 1992 as an attaché of the Ministry of Foreign Affairs of the Kyrgyz Republic. 

• 1993-1996 - Third Secretary, Second Secretary of the Embassy of the Kyrgyz Republic in the PRC.

• 1996-1997 - First Secretary of the Ministry of Foreign Affairs of the Kyrgyz Republic

• 1997-1999 - Head of the Consular Department of the Ministry of Foreign Affairs of the Kyrgyz Republic

• 1999-2001 - Counselor of the Embassy of the Kyrgyz Republic in Germany (Berlin).

• 2001-2003 - Counselor of the Embassy of the Kyrgyz Republic in the PRC (Beijing).

• 2003-03.2004 - Head of the Department of Eastern Countries of the Ministry of Foreign Affairs of the Kyrgyz Republic

• 03.2004-29.04.2005 - National Coordinator of the SCO from the Kyrgyz Republic of the Ministry of Foreign Affairs of the Kyrgyz Republic.

• 29.04.2005-24.07.2007 - Deputy Minister of Foreign Affairs of the Kyrgyz Republic - National Coordinator of the Shanghai Cooperation Organization from the Kyrgyz Republic. 

• From 24.07.2007 - 23 Jan. 2009 - Ambassador Extraordinary and Plenipotentiary of the Kyrgyz Republic to the People's Republic of China, as well as (concurrently) in Resbulik Singapore and Mongolia.
 
• Since January 26, 2009 - Minister of Foreign Affairs of the Kyrgyz Republic. 

• From October 26, 2009 - Apr. 2010 - State Minister of Foreign Affairs of the Kyrgyz Republic. 

Has the diplomatic rank of Extraordinary and Plenipotentiary.

References

Ambassadors of Kyrgyzstan to China
Government ministers of Kyrgyzstan
People from Bishkek
Foreign ministers of Kyrgyzstan
1966 births
Living people